Romualdo Rossi (1877-1968) was an Italian writer, editor and a journalist.
Initially close to Benito Mussolini, he criticized Duce's stances, especially before the Italy's entrance into the second world war.
He was co-founder, editor and collaborator of many papers close the Italian trade union. Among them, Rossi founded the "Diana" with the collaboration of Italo Balbo and the former socialist Renato Castelfranchi.

One of his most famous book is "Mussolini nudo alla meta" (Mussolini naked to the destination), written in 1944. It would seem that the sentence "nudo alla meta" was first pronounced by Benito Mussolini in 1923. After the Dodecanese was formally annexed by Italy Mussolini refused with scorn the title of duca di Rodi (duke of Rhode), as he considered that useless and meaningless.

Works

 Rappresaglia fascista e Fascismo, 9 Aprile 1921, Roma
 Mazzini e il fascismo : sintesi critica e polemica / Romualdo Rossi ; prefazione di Emilio Settimelli, Livorno : Massima editrice, stampa 1931  [Identificativo SBN http://id.sbn.it/bid/RAV0219643]
 Briciole di Filosofia rivoluzionaria, Roma : Casa Editr. Pinciana, 1932 (Ind. Tip. Romana). [Identificativo SBN http://id.sbn.it/bid/CUB0563322]
 Filippo Corridoni : tribuno del popolo  Roma" : Pianciana, 1933 [Identificativo SBN http://id.sbn.it/bid/TO01661248]
 La bilancia de l'osservatore romano, Roma : Ideal, 1934 (Tip. F.lli Pallotta)  [Identificativo SBN http://id.sbn.it/bid/CUB0563325]
 Note polemiche sul Mazzini (di Nazzareno Mezzetti) - Casa Editrice Pinciana, Roma 1934
 Eresie di un rivoluzionario": L'Intransigente, 1935  [Identificativo SBN http://id.sbn.it/bid/RMG0290093]
 Ai margini della rivoluzione" Roma : Pattuglia Nera, 1936  [Identificativo SBN http://id.sbn.it/bid/CUB0563321]
 Il fuoco" Roma : Ed. di Pattuglia nera, 1939  [Identificativo SBN http://id.sbn.it/bid/UBO3476625]
 L'ora della Chiesa, Roma : Ed. Di Pattuglia Nera, 1942 (Tip. U. Quintily). [Identificativo SBN http://id.sbn.it/bid/CUB0563324]
 Mussolini nudo alla meta, Roma, 1944  [Identificativo SBN http://id.sbn.it/bid/LO10365085]
 Compendio di legislazione per I candidati ai concorsi magistrali : Ordinamento dello Stato italiano e della scuola elementare. Stato giuridico dei Maestri, Firenze : F. Le Monnier, 1951 (Tip. E. Ariani e L'arte Della Stampa)  [Identificativo SBN http://id.sbn.it/bid/CUB0559156]
 Evoluzione del sindacalismo : Da Karl Marx a Giuseppe Mazzini. Prefazione di Raffaele Passaretti. Giudizi di Giulietti e Del Fante, Roma : Ed. Di parlamento, 1956 (Tip. Babuino)  [Identificativo SBN http://id.sbn.it/bid/CUB0563323]
 Evoluzione del sindacalismo : Da Karl Marx a Giuseppe Mazzini. Roma : Ediz. di Parlamento, 1956 [Identificativo SBN http://id.sbn.it/bid/PAL0219223]
 L'Europa al bivio / Romualdo Rossi, Roma : Pallotta, 1964 [Identificativo SBN http://id.sbn.it/bid/FOG0234579]

Italian male writers
1877 births
1968 deaths